There are two rivers of this name in Great Britain:
River Eye, Gloucestershire, England
River Eye, Leicestershire, England

See also
Eye Water, a river in the Scottish Borders
Eye Brook, a river in Rutland, England